Cap-Rouge can refer to:

Cap-Rouge, Quebec City, a borough in Quebec City
Cap-Rouge, Nova Scotia
Cap-Rouge trestle, a bridge in the borough in Quebec City
Rivière du Cap Rouge, a river that passes through Quebec City

See also

 
 Rouge (disambiguation)
 Cap (disambiguation)